Sociedade Esportiva Palmeiras, commonly known as Palmeiras, is a professional women's association football club based in Vinhedo, São Paulo, Brazil. Founded in 1997, the team is affiliated with Federação Paulista de Futebol and play their home games at Estádio Nelo Bracalente. The team colors, reflected in their logo and uniform, are green and white. They play in the top tier of women's football in Brazil, the Campeonato Brasileiro de Futebol Feminino, and in the Campeonato Paulista de Futebol Feminino, the first division of the traditional in-state competition.

History

First spell
The Brazilian Football Confederation (CBF) successfully encouraged Palmeiras and its other leading clubs to form female teams in 1997, after the national women's team's performance had exceeded expectations at the 1996 Olympics.

In the initial phase of its existence, Palmeiras's women's team fielded several national team players and became competitive in state and national competition. Two of the 20-player Brazil squad at the 1999 FIFA Women's World Cup, Cidinha and Sissi, were contracted to Palmeiras. The team finished as runners-up in the 1999–2000 National Championship and won the controversial 2001 Campeonato Paulista de Futebol Feminino.

In subsequent years Palmeiras competed only intermittently in women's competitions, by outsourcing their women's and girls teams to nearby local authorities, including São Bernardo do Campo (2005–06), Salto (2008) and Bauru in 2012.

Return

Sociedade Esportiva Palmeiras urgently required a women's team in December 2018, as they faced being banned from the lucrative men's Copa Libertadores under CONMEBOL rules which required all participants to run women's teams. Another outsourcing agreement saw Palmeiras agree to fund the salaries of players and staff from the Valinhos club, who would use the Palmeiras name but continue to play and train in Vinhedo.

The partnership between Palmeiras and the municipality of Vinhedo was extended in January 2020 after a successful first season in which promotion to the top-flight Campeonato Brasileiro de Futebol Feminino A1 was secured. Palmeiras paid for improvements to the facilities at Estádio Nelo Bracalente. A scheme allowing entry to matches in exchange for donations of non-perishable food was also deemed a success.

In 2020 Palmeiras continued to invest and develop but were beaten by rivals Corinthians in the semi-finals of both state and national competitions. Some important matches were staged at Allianz Parque. Kit supplier Puma gave sponsorships to 23 of the club's female players in September 2020. The arrangement with Vinhedo was extended for a further year in January 2021, while the squad was overhauled in an attempt to wrest supremacy away from Corinthians.

Players

Current squad

Former players
For details of current and former players, see :Category:Sociedade Esportiva Palmeiras (women) players.

Honours

 Copa Libertadores (1): 2022
 Campeonato Paulista (2): 2001, 2022
 Copa Paulista (2): 2019, 2021
 Jogos Regionais (3): 2005, 2008, 2010

References

General references

External links
  

women
Association football clubs established in 1997
P
1997 establishments in Brazil